Chrusty may refer to: 

Places:
Chrusty, Aleksandrów County in Kuyavian-Pomeranian Voivodeship (north-central Poland)
Chrusty, Chełmno County in Kuyavian-Pomeranian Voivodeship (north-central Poland)
Chrusty, Łask County in Łódź Voivodeship (central Poland)
Chrusty, Rawa County in Łódź Voivodeship (central Poland)
Chrusty, Świętokrzyskie Voivodeship (south-central Poland)
Chrusty, Masovian Voivodeship (east-central Poland)
Chrusty, Gmina Lisków in Greater Poland Voivodeship (west-central Poland)
Chrusty, Gmina Żelazków in Greater Poland Voivodeship (west-central Poland)
Chrusty, Konin County in Greater Poland Voivodeship (west-central Poland)

Food:
Chrusty, a fried dough also known as Angel Wings